Paul Chemetov (born 10 october 1928) is a French architect and urbanist. He is best known for his collaborations with Borja Huidobro.

Biography
Chemetov was born in Paris on 6 September 1928. As a student, he belonged to the Union of Communist Students. He graduated from the National School of Fine Arts in 1959. In 1961, he joined the AAU. He has designed several buildings with Borja Huidobro (b. 1936, Santiago, Chile) since 1983. He also has two daughters Marianne - who married to famous cinematographer Darius Khondji and Agnès Chemetoff.

Partial works

In 1960–64, Chemetov worked on the housing complex in Vigneux. From 1981–88 he worked on the  Ministry of the Economy, Industry and Employment, one of the Grands Projets of François Mitterrand, with Huidobro From 1982–1985 he worked on the French Embassy in New Delhi, India, with Borja Huidobro and in December 1982 won the Ministry of Finances competition. In 1988 he designed the Fontaines du Ministère in Paris and from 1989–1994 was responsible for the renovation of the main gallery of the evolution of the National Museum of Natural History, with Huidobro. In 1992 Chemetov was responsible for the development of a tram from Bobigny to Saint-Denis and in 1994 worked on the library-media center at Évreux, with Huidobro. In 1999 he designed the Méridienne verte, in 2000 he designed the public library at Montpellier, with Huidobro and in 2001 designed the Arènes de Metz, with Huidobro. In 2001 he worked on the public library at Châlons-en-Champagne.

References

External links
 Official website (in French)
 Interview with Paul Chemetov (in French) about - What is architecture?, 2014
 Paul Chemetov at ARCHGUIDE (in French and English)

1928 births
20th-century French architects
French urban planners
Living people
Architects from Paris
Members of the Académie d'architecture
École des Beaux-Arts alumni
Academic staff of the École Polytechnique Fédérale de Lausanne
Commandeurs of the Légion d'honneur
Officiers of the Ordre des Arts et des Lettres
Officers of the Ordre national du Mérite